Lyell Butte is a  elevation summit located in the Grand Canyon, in Coconino County of northern Arizona, United States. Access is via the Tonto Trail which traverses the base of the peak. According to the Köppen climate classification system, Lyell Butte is located in a cold semi-arid climate zone, with precipitation runoff draining northeast to the Colorado River via Grapevine and Boulder Creeks.

History
Lyell Butte was named in 1906 after Sir Charles Lyell (1797–1875), eminent Scottish geologist best known as the author of Principles of Geology. This feature's name was officially adopted in 1906 by the U.S. Board on Geographic Names. The first ascent of Lyell Butte was made January 24, 1970, by Alan Doty via the northwest face/chimney.

Geology
Lyell Butte is composed of Mississippian Redwall Limestone, with a dome of the basal layer of Pennsylvanian-Permian Supai Group on top which dips to the northeast. The cliff-forming Redwall overlays the Cambrian Tonto Group, and below that Paleoproterozoic Vishnu Basement Rocks at river level in Granite Gorge.

See also
 Geology of the Grand Canyon area

References

External links

 Weather forecast: National Weather Service

Grand Canyon
Landforms of Coconino County, Arizona
Buttes of Arizona
Colorado Plateau
Grand Canyon National Park
North American 1000 m summits
Grand Canyon, South Rim